Kuhnt is a German surname. Notable people with the surname include:

Hermann Kuhnt (1850–1925), German ophthalmologist
Irina Kuhnt (born 1968), German field hockey player 
Werner Kuhnt (1893–?), German footballer

See also
Kuhn

German-language surnames
Surnames from given names